The rufous-bellied antwren (Isleria guttata) is a species of bird in the family Thamnophilidae.It is found in Brazil, French Guiana, Guyana, Suriname, and Venezuela. The bird's range is in the entire north of the Amazon Basin, from Venezuela in the west to the Brazilian state of Amapá to the east, but is not found south of the Amazon River.

Its natural habitat is subtropical or tropical moist lowland forests.

The rufous-bellied antwren was described and illustrated by the French ornithologist Louis Vieillot in 1824 and given the binomial name Myrmothera guttata. The current genus Isleria was introduced in 2012.

References

External links
Rufous-bellied antwren videos on the Internet Bird Collection
Rufous-bellied antwren photo gallery VIREO Photo-High Res

rufous-bellied antwren
Birds of the Guianas
Birds of the Venezuelan Amazon
rufous-bellied antwren
Taxa named by Louis Jean Pierre Vieillot
Taxonomy articles created by Polbot